Umuehere is a neighborhood of Port Harcourt in southeastern Nigeria, located on the north side of the city.

Neighbourhoods in Port Harcourt